Raw Timber is a 1937 American lumberjack Western film directed by Ray Taylor and starring Tom Keene, Kathryn Keys and Budd Buster.

The film's sets were designed by the art director Frank Dexter.

Cast

 Tom Keene as Tom Corbin  
 Kathryn Keys as Dale McFarland 
 Budd Buster as Kentuck  
 Robert Fiske as Bart Williams  
 Lee Phelps as Goss 'Bull' Riley  
 Jack Rutherford as Supervisor Lane 
 Ray Bennett as Insp. Joe Hanlon 
 Bartlett A. Carre as The Coroner  
 Fred Parker as Frank  
 Dorothy Vernon as Housekeeper  
 Slim Whitaker as Sheriff

References

Bibliography
 Pitts, Michael R. Western Movies: A Guide to 5,105 Feature Films. McFarland, 2012.

External links
 

1937 films
1937 Western (genre) films
American Western (genre) films
Films directed by Ray Taylor
American black-and-white films
Films directed by Howard Higgin
Films set in forests
Films about lumberjacks
1930s English-language films
1930s American films